Nina Pope (born 1967) is an artist that works with public art, installation, film making, and internet publishing that lives and works in London. Most of her work is done in collaboration with Karen Guthrie.  Pope and Guthrie started working together as a collaborative duo in 1995 on projects that "enrich and inform public life"and they founded creative non-profit Somewhere (artist collective) in 2001.

Education
Nina Pope attended the Edinburgh College of Art from 1987 to 1991, receiving a BA in Printmaking.  She attended the Chelsea School of Art in London from 1991 to 1993, receiving a MA in Printmaking.

Career
Pope began working with Karen Guthrie in 1995. Pope was part of an artist collective called The People From Off, which contributed to 'A Different Weekend' with their 'Festival of Lying'. Its members included Karen Guthrie, Anna Best, and Simon Poulter. She has an academic post at the Royal College of Art in Design Interactions and as an artist advisor. Pope and Guthrie founded Somewhere (artist collective), a creative non-profit to produce collaborative projects of interests.

Films
The Closer We Get, as director of photography & producer (2014)
Jaywick Escapes, as co-director & co-producer (2012)
Cat Fancy Club, as co-director & co-producer (2008)
Little Deluxe Living, as artist & collaborator (2008)
Almanac, artist & collaborator (2007)
Living with the Tudors (aka Sometime Later) (2007)
Bata-ville: We are not afraid of the future (2005)
Welcome To (2003)

Exhibitions, commissions, and other projects
Tomorrow, Today 2014 - University of Cambridge NW Cambridge public art commission
Past, Present, Somewhere 2014 - Retrospective solo show, Kettles Yard, Cambridge
Art Lending Library 2012 - Contributing artists to project by Walker & Bromwich, Glasgow International Festival, Market Gallery
The Floating Cinema, London 2011 – ongoing
Can Art Save Us? 2010 - Millennium Galleries, Sheffield. Multiple 'Titchy/Kitschy' shown in Grizedale Arts contribution
Abbey Gardens, What Will The Harvest Be? Commissioned by London Borough of Newham 2009 – ongoing
A Circle of Happiness, Jaywick Martello Tower 2009
Schnucken, Elefanten und andere Gastgeschenke 2009 - Kunstverein Springhornhof, Germany. Multiple 'Titchy/Kitschy' shown in myvillages.org
Agrifashionista.tv - Commissioned by A Foundation & Grizedale Arts for Rochelle School, London. Two projects - Karen Guthrie's 'The Grotto' (postponed indefinitely) and a musical collaboration 'A Song for a Circus' between Nina Pope and Tim Olden.
Broadcast Yourself 2007 - TV swansong archive exhibited as part of group show at Hatton Gallery (Newcastle) and Cornerhouse (Manchester)
Almanac, Public art commission for the redevelopment of Cinema City, Norwich 2007
Sometime Later, Commissioned by BBC & Arts Council England, 2006
Pilot 3 2007 - Selected for archive for artists & curators, shown at Atelier Bevilacqua, Venice Biennale (Italy)
Romantic Detachment,  Video work, group show, PS1, New York City & touring to Q in Derby, Folly in Lancaster & Chapter in Cardiff 2004
London Underground Platform for Art, Featured artists 2003
Live Culture, Curators exhibitors, video programme, Tate Modern, London 2003
TV Swansong,  Nationwide public art site-specific webcast project commissioning 8 artists  (artists / curators) 2002
The Festival of Lying 2000 - Live event & web cast with Anna Best & Simon Poulter; Grizedale Show, Cumbria, UK

Awards and honors
2008 Northern Art Prize awarded to Karen Guthrie and Nina Pope.
2010 Karen Guthrie and Nina Pope's new media installation ‘An Artist’s Impression’ was acquired by the Science Museum, London

References

Further reading

External links
Somewhere a creative non-profit run by Nina Pope and Karen Guthrie

1967 births
Alumni of Chelsea College of Arts
Alumni of the Edinburgh College of Art
Artists from London
British women artists
British filmmakers
Date of birth missing (living people)
Living people
Place of birth missing (living people)